The Hush Now is an American indie rock quintet from Boston, Massachusetts.

The band has been described as "audio candy for the art school crowd". They performed at CMJ 2010.

Discography

Albums
 Sparkle Drive (2014)
 Memos (2011)
 Constellations (2010)
 The Hush Now (2008)

EPs
 Shiver Me Starships (2010)

References
Footnotes

General references

The Boston Phoenix Editor's Event Pick: The Hush Now
Americana UK review of The Hush Now
The Noise review of The Hush Now
Patrol Magazine review of 'The Hush Now'

Musical groups from Boston
Indie rock musical groups from Massachusetts
Musical groups established in 2006